The 2013–14 North Texas Mean Green women's basketball team represents the University of North Texas during the 2013–14 NCAA Division I women's basketball season. The Mean Green, led by second year head coach Mike Petersen, play their home games at The Super Pit, also known as UNT Coliseum,  and were first year members of Conference USA. They finished the season 12–18 overall, 6–10 in C-USA for a 5 way tie for a ninth place finish. They lost in the first round in the 2014 Conference USA women's basketball tournament to Louisiana Tech.

Roster

Schedule
 
|-
!colspan=9| Regular Season

|-
!colspan=9| 2014 C-USA Tournament

See also
2013–14 North Texas Mean Green men's basketball team

References

North Texas Mean Green women's basketball seasons
North Texas Mean Green
North Texas
North Texas